Lin Tong Mei is a village in Sheung Shui, North District, Hong Kong.

Administration
Lin Tong Mei is a recognized village under the New Territories Small House Policy. It is one of the villages represented within the Sheung Shui District Rural Committee. For electoral purposes, Lin Tong Mei is part of the Sheung Shui Rural constituency, which is currently represented by Simon Hau Fuk-tat.

References

Villages in North District, Hong Kong
Sheung Shui